John Serle may refer to:

John Serle (MP for Plympton Erle), 1414–1449, MP for Plympton Erle
John Serle (died c. 1456), MP for Portsmouth

See also
John Searle (born 1932), American philosopher